Eulima deshayesi is a species of sea snail, a marine gastropod mollusk in the family Eulimidae.

References

External links
 To World Register of Marine Species

deshayesi
Gastropods described in 1888